Mount Miaofeng is a mountain in the northwestern Beijing, an extension of the Taihang Mountains. It is located in the Mentougou District of Beijing about 70 kilometers to the northwest of downtown Beijing.

Mount Miaofeng is culturally significant as a site of worship for the Taoist goddess Bixia Yuanjun also known as the "Heavenly Jade Maiden" who is associated with Mount Tai ("Empress of Mount Tai"). Mount Miaofeng is the western terminus of a pilgrimage route from Beijing. The pilgrimage and the temple fair were held during the fourth month of the Chinese lunar calendar.

References

Mountains of Beijing
Sacred places in Taoism
Taoist temples in Beijing